Richard Mitchell (1929–2002) was an American professor of English and classics.

Richard Mitchell may also refer to:

Politicians
 Richard Mitchell (MP for Weymouth and Melcombe Regis), MP for Weymouth and Melcombe Regis
 Richard H. Mitchell (1869–1933), New York politician and judge
 Bob Mitchell (British politician) (Richard Charles Mitchell, 1927–2003), English politician

Musicians
 Richard G. Mitchell (born 1956), film composer
 Blue Mitchell (Richard Allen Mitchell, 1930–1979), American trumpeter

Others
 Mike Mitchell (cricketer) (Richard Arthur Henry Mitchell, 1843–1905), English amateur cricketer
 Richard Mitchell (cricketer, born 1913), Grenadian-born Trinidadian cricketer
 Richard B. Mitchell, American emergency and disaster management specialist
 Richard F. Mitchell, justice of the Iowa Supreme Court
 Richard P. Mitchell, history professor at the University of Michigan
 R. Bland Mitchell, Episcopal bishop
 Rick Mitchell (Richard Charles Mitchell, born 1955), Australian track and field athlete
 Richard Mitchell (EastEnders), fictional character